"It's a Rainy Day" is a song by British, Italy based Eurodance artist Ice MC, released in August 1994 as the third single from his third album, Ice'n'Green (1994), on which it appears in two versions, and his eleventh single overall. Written and produced by Robyx, it features vocals by Italian singer Alexia. It became the most successful single of the album, reaching number-one in Italy and number two in both Belgium and Spain. The single was also released with new remixes for the Christmas holidays. Giacomo De Simone directed its accompanying music video.

Chart performance
"It's a Rainy Day" was a sizeable hit on the charts in Europe and remains one of Ice MC's most successful songs to date. It peaked at number-one in Italy, as well as on the European Dance Radio Chart. The single made its way into the top 10 also in Belgium (number two), Finland, France, the Netherlands and Spain (number two), and on the Eurochart Hot 100, where it hit number six in December 1994. Additionally, "It's a Rainy Day" charted in the top 20 in Austria, Germany and Switzerland. In the United Kingdom, it peaked at number 73 in its first week on the UK Singles Chart, on April 2, 1995. But on the UK Dance Chart, the song fared better, reaching number 25. Outside Europe, it peaked at number six on the RPM Dance/Urban chart in Canada and number 11 in Israel. The single was awarded with a silver record in France, with a sale of 132,000 units.

Critical reception
A reviewer from Music Week gave "It's a Rainy Day" three out of five, adding that "this dance track has been a hit in a few European countries and uses the familiar formula of diggedy doggedy vocal over a thumping beat." James Hamilton from the RM Dance Update described it as an "Italian galloper".

Music video
The accompanying music video for "It's a Rainy Day" was directed by Giacomo De Simone. It features Italian singer Alexia and was A-listed on Germany's VIVA in November 1994. Later it was published on YouTube in September 2014, and as of December 2022, it had received more than 27 million views. De Simone had previously directed the video for "Think about the Way".

Track listings
These are the formats and track listings of major single releases of "It's a Rainy Day".

Original release

 CD maxi - Germany, Sweden, Italy, Spain
 "It's a Rainy Day" (radio version) — 4:12
 "It's a Rainy Day" (euro club mix) — 6:52
 "It's a Rainy Day" (happyman mix) — 6:30
 "It's a Rainy Day" (happyman dub) — 5:45
 "It's a Rainy Day" (a cappella fast) — 4:11
 "It's a Rainy Day" (a cappella slow) — 2:20

 CD maxi - Belgium
 "It's a Rainy Day" (radio version) — 4:12
 "It's a Rainy Day" (euro club mix) — 6:52
 "It's a Rainy Day" (happyman mix) — 6:30
 "It's a Rainy Day" (happyman dub) — 5:45

 CD maxi - Lebanon
 "It's a Rainy Day" - Lebanon , Syria  (Dj Petro Club Mix) 5:00

 CD maxi - UK
 "It's a Rainy Day" (Lee Marrow mix - UK radio edit) — 3:19
 "It's a Rainy Day" (original radio version) — 4:12
 "It's a Rainy Day" (Lee Marrow extended - UK edit) — 6:34
 "It's a Rainy Day" (Jules & Skins Stormy house vocal mix) — 7:14
 "It's a Rainy Day" (happy man mix) — 6:30
 "It's a Rainy Day" (mad sun remix) — 5:22
 "It's a Rainy Day" (Lee Marrow thunder remix) — 6:35

 CD maxi - Germany
 "It's a Rainy Day" (radio version) — 4:15
 "It's a Rainy Day" (euro club mix) — 6:55
 "It's a Rainy Day" (happy man mix) — 6:33
 "It's a Rainy Day" (eh - eh - mix) — 5:17
 "It's a Rainy Day" (new extended mix) — 6:37
 "It's a Rainy Day" (ferrari remix) — 5:47
 "It's a Rainy Day" (mad sun remix) — 5:23

 CD single - France, Belgium
 "It's a Rainy Day" (radio version) — 4:12
 "It's a Rainy Day" (happyman mix) — 6:30

 CD maxi - Remixes - Italy
 "It's a Rainy Day" (ferrari radio eemix) — 3:59
 "It's a Rainy Day" (original radio mix) — 4:19
 "It's a Rainy Day" (new extended remix) — 6:41
 "It's a Rainy Day" (thunder remix) — 6:40
 "It's a Rainy Day" (eh - eh - mix) — 5:19
 "It's a Rainy Day" (mad sun remix) — 5:28
 "It's a Rainy Day" (ferrari remix) — 5:49
 "Dark Night Rider" (long version) — 6:35

 12" maxi - Italy
 "It's a Rainy Day" (euro club mix) — 6:52
 "It's a Rainy Day" (radio version) — 4:12
 "It's a Rainy Day" (happyman mix) — 6:30
 "It's a Rainy Day" (happyman dub) — 5:45

 12" maxi - Belgium, Germany, Spain
 "It's a Rainy Day" (euro club mix) — 6:52
 "It's a Rainy Day" (radio version) — 4:12
 "It's a Rainy Day" (a cappella fast) — 4:11
 "It's a Rainy Day" (happyman mix) — 6:30
 "It's a Rainy Day" (happyman dub) — 5:45
 "It's a Rainy Day" (a cappella slow) — 2:20

 12" maxi - UK
 "It's a Rainy Day" (Lee Marrow mix - UK extended radio edit) — 6:34
 "It's a Rainy Day" (happy man mix) — 6:30
 "It's a Rainy Day" (mad sun remix) — 5:22
 "It's a Rainy Day" (Jules & Skins Stormy house vocal mix) — 7:14
 "It's a Rainy Day" (euro club mix) — 6:52

Christmas remixes
 CD single
 "It's a Rainy Day" (Christmas remix radio edit) — 4:38
 "It's a Rainy Day" (Christmas remix) — 7:00

 CD maxi
 "It's a Rainy Day" (Christmas remix radio) — 4:38
 "It's a Rainy Day" (Christmas remix long) — 7:00
 "It's a Rainy Day" (new extended remix) — 6:35
 "It's a Rainy Day" (ferrari remix) — 5:43
 "It's a Rainy Day" (thunder remix) — 6:30
 "It's a Rainy Day" (mad sun remix) — 5:22

 12" maxi
 "It's a Rainy Day" (Christmas remix - long version) — 7:00
 "Dark Night Rider" (long edit) — 6:31
 "It's a Rainy Day" (Christmas remix - radio version) — 4:38

Charts and sales

Weekly charts

Year-end charts

Certifications and sales

References

1994 songs
1994 singles
Alexia (Italian singer) songs
English-language Italian songs
Ice MC songs
Number-one singles in Italy
Music videos directed by Giacomo De Simone
Songs about weather
Songs written by Roberto Zanetti